Reston Scar is a fell in the Lake District of Cumbria, England. It overlooks the north side of Staveley village, and is listed among Alfred Wainwright's "Outlying Fells of Lakeland" guide. The summit offers good views of the Coniston Fells, the Sca Fells and the Langdale Pikes.

The main footpath up to the summit from Staveley passes to the south of Kemp Tarn, the largest of several ponds on the Scar. In his book The Outlying Fells of Lakeland, Wainwright describes the ascent of Reston Scar from Staveley and calls the fell "a fine place for a siesta on a sunny day".

References

Fells of the Lake District
South Lakeland District